Mahonia paucijuga is a shrub in the family Berberidaceae described as a species in 1987. It is endemic to the province of Yunnan in southwestern China.

References

Endemic flora of Yunnan
paucijuga
Vulnerable plants
Plants described in 1987